Farwell High School is a public high school located in Farwell, Texas, USA.  It is part of the Farwell Independent School District located in west central Parmer County and classified as a 2A school by the UIL.  In 2015, the school was rated "Met Standard" by the Texas Education Agency.

Athletics
Farwell High School competes in these sports - 

Basketball
Cross Country
Football
Golf
Powerlifting
Track and Field

State Titles

Girls Basketball - 
2002(2A)
Girls Golf - 
1975(1A), 1976(1A), 1977(1A), 1980(1A)

References

External links
Farwell Independent School District

Schools in Parmer County, Texas
Public high schools in Texas